Philip Leonard Rhodes (1895–1974) was an American naval architect known for his diverse yacht designs.

Life
Rhodes designed a wide variety of vessels from 7' dinghies to 123' motor-sailors, from hydrofoil racers to America's Cup winners - his 12 Meter class Weatherly (USA-17) winning the 1962 defense. His work also included large motor yachts, commercial and military vessels such as minesweepers and police boats. His clients ranged from Rockefellers to Sears & Roebuck.

Rhodes was born in 1895 in Thurman, Ohio. He attended MIT, graduating in 1918 in naval architecture and marine engineering. He worked for the US Army Corps of Engineers during World War I. After the war he began work as a shipfitter in Lorain, Ohio. He later moved to New York where he opened a small office as a marine architect.

Rhodes joined the design firm of Cox & Stevens in 1934, becoming head naval architect there after the death of lead designer Bruno Tornroth in 1935. In 1946, the firm of Philip L. Rhodes succeeded Cox & Stevens Inc. It closed in 1974 following Rhodes's death.

Rhodes formed his own company,  Philip L. Rhodes, Naval Architects and Marine Engineers.

Rhodes was one of the pioneers in the transition to fiberglass construction. The Bounty II for Coleman Plastics and Aeromarine in 1956 became one of the earliest yachts built of fiberglass, and established the viability of the new material for larger production boats.

Designs
 Chesapeake 32
 Northern 25
 Mariner 19
 Meridian 25
 Rhodes 18
 Rhodes 19
 Rhodes 22
 Rhodes 33
 Rhodes Evergreen
 Rhodes 27 38 foot International Rule, racer cruiser
 Rhodes Seabreeze class, a 33-foot sloop sold by Seafarer Yachts
 Rhodes Meridian, a 24-foot sloop sold by Seafarer Yachts
 Pearson Vanguard, a 33-foot sloop built in Rhode Island by Pearson Yachts
 Aeromarine Bounty II - a 41ft sloop or yawl, built by Aeromarine in Sausalito California. Accredited as being the first glassfibre production yacht. 
 Pearson Rhodes 41 a 41-foot sloop based on the Bounty II, built in Rhode Island by Pearson Yachts
 Rhodes Reliant, a 41-foot sloop or yawl based on the Bounty II, built by Cheoy Lee Shipyard in Hong Kong
 Rhodes 77
 Cheoy Lee Offshore 40
 Rhodes Bantam, a 14-foot sloop (daysailer/racer)
 O'Day Tempest 23
 Seafarer Bahama 35 MS
 Seafarer 36C
 Seafarer 38/Rhodes 38
 Swiftsure 33
 Woodpussy
 Grumman Dinghy, an innovative aluminum dinghy designed to use Grumman Aircraft's post-war excess manufacturing capacity
 O'Day Widgeon, a 12-foot sailing dinghy
 O'Day Sprite, a 10-foot fiberglass sailing dinghy
 Outlaw 26
 International Penguin Class racing dinghy
 Dyer Dhow, one of the first production fiberglass boats
 Dyer Dink

References

Further reading

 Rhodes bequeathed his designs to the Mystic Seaport Museum Collection, which has a short biography.
Philip L. Rhodes Analytical Biography Temple University

 Stavis, Ben Philip L. Rhodes Analytical Biography and archive

External links
 Philip Rhodes Sail Boats

Philip Rhodes
United States Army Corps of Engineers personnel
United States Army personnel of World War I
1895 births
1974 deaths